The Man Who Wouldn't Die is a 1942 Mystery directed by Herbert I. Leeds, starring Lloyd Nolan and Marjorie Weaver. This movie is the 5th of a series of seven of the Michael Shayne movies produced by Twentieth Century Fox between 1940-1942.

Plot summary

Cast

 Lloyd Nolan as Michael Shayne
 Marjorie Weaver as Kay Wolff Blake
 Helene Reynolds as Anna Wolff
 Henry Wilcoxon as Dr. Haggard
 Richard Derr as Roger Blake
 Paul Harvey (actor) as Dudley Wolff
 Billy Bevan as Phillips - the Butler
 Olin Howland as Chief of Police Jonathan Meek (as Olin Howlin)
 Robert Emmett Keane as Alfred Dunning
 LeRoy Mason as Zorah Bey
 Jeff Corey as Coroner Tim Larsen
 Francis Ford as Caretaker

References

External links 
 
 
 
 

1942 films
American black-and-white films
Films set in 1942
American mystery drama films
American detective films
Films based on American novels
American crime drama films
20th Century Fox films
Films directed by Herbert I. Leeds
Films scored by David Raksin
Films based on mystery novels
1940s mystery drama films
Films with screenplays by Arnaud d'Usseau
1942 crime drama films
1940s English-language films
1940s American films